Königsegg-Rothenfels was a state in far southwestern Bavaria, Germany, located north of Austria and west of Baden-Württemberg. It was created as a partition of the Barony of Königsegg in 1622, and was raised to a county seven years later. It was sold to Austria in 1804, but was granted to Bavaria by France in 1805 at the Peace of Pressburg during the Napoleonic Wars.

Baron of Königsegg-Rothenfels (1622–29) 
 Hugh (1622–29)

Counts of Königsegg-Rothenfels (1629–1804) 
 Hugh (1629–66)
 Leopold William (1666–94)
 Sigmund William (1694–1709)
 Albert (1709–36), married Maria von Manderscheid-Blankenheim
 Maximilian Friedrich, Archbishop-Elector of Cologne
 Charles Ferdinand (1736–59)
 Francis Hugh (1759–71)
 Francis Fidelis Anthony (1771–1804)

Other family members 
 Karl Ferdinand, Graf von Königsegg-Rothenfels, married to Hélène de Boisschot, Baroness of Saventhem
 Dominik von Königsegg-Rothenfels
 Christian Moritz Graf Königsegg und Rothenfels

1622 establishments in the Holy Roman Empire
Counties of the Holy Roman Empire
1804 disestablishments in the Holy Roman Empire

nl:Immenstadt im Allgäu